Foo Tye Sin was a Justice of the Peace and an influential community leader of 19th century. Penang born Foo Tye Sin, a British subject, was a Hakka tin miner who could trace his ancestry to the Yong Ting District, Ting Chou Prefecture, Fujian. He was educated at St. Xavier's Institution and the Penang Free School. Tye Sin Street, or Lebuh Tye Sin as it is now known as, is named after him.

Disturbances at Pinang and Larut
He was involved in events leading up to the signing of the Pangkor Treaty that would end the ten-year Larut Wars. His services were often called for in arbitration proceedings between the Hai San and Ghee Hin societies involved in the Larut Wars. Foo Tye Sin was one of three Chinese considered respectable enough to sit on the commission of inquiry into the 1867 Penang riots. He was the only non-partisan Chinese at a ceasefire conference called by Lt. Governor Anson at the height of the Larut war, even though he was, according to CS Wong, "...overtly and independent, but covertly a Hai San sympathiser." Foo Tye Sin and Ong Boon Teik were creditors of Ngah Ibrahim the Mantri of Larut. In early 1872, Foo Tye Sin and Ong Boon Teik sued Ngah Ibrahim.

Tye Sin Tat and Co.
Foo Tye Sin and Koh Seang Tat, a descendant of Koh Lay Huan, the first Kapitan China of Penang, were business partners in the firm of Tye Sin Tat & Co., ships' chandlers, which was located at Beach Street. They were, together, two of the three Chinese Justices of the Peace in 1874."

The Penang Khean Guan Insurance Company (1886)
He was a founder and member of the board of directors of the Penang Khean Guan Insurance Company. The board was composed thus:

Name of Partners
 Tan Ley Kum, Chairman
 Cheah Chean Eok, Secretary
 Lee Phee Yeow, Chong Moh & Co.
 Cheah Eu Ghee, Chie Hin & Co.
 Khoo Thean Teik, Chin Bee & Co.
 Khoo Sim Bee, Ee Soon & Co.
 Cheah Tek Soon, Sin Eng Moh & Co.
 Ong Beng Tek, Ban Chin Hong & Co.
 Foo Tye Sin
 Yeoh Cheng Tek, Hong Thye & Co.
 Khaw Sim Bee, Koe Guan & Co.
 Cheah Leng Hoon, Eng Ban Hong & Co.
 Gan Kim Swee, Aing Joo & Co.
 Tan Lim Keng, Kim Cheang & Co.
 Ong Boon Tek, Treasurer
 Logan & Ross: Solicitors

Pitt Street Kong Hock Temple (1887)
Together with Khaw Boo Aun (also spelt Koh Boo Aun), Khoo Thean Teik and Cheah Tek Soon, He was made a trustee of the Pitt Street Kong Hock Temple in 1887, with the power to appoint and remove monks.

Penang Po Leung Kuk (1889)
Along with Koh Seang Tat, Khaw Sim Bee, Ong Boon Teik and Ong Beng Teik, he was a founder of The Penang Po Leung Kuk (1889).

Foo Tye Sin Mansion
Foo Tye Sin's mansion was one of the first non-European mansions to be erected along Light Street.

References

Further reading
The Journals of J. W. W. Birch, First British Resident to Perak, 1874–1875: First British Resident to Perak, 1874–75 By James Wheeler Woodford Birch, Peter Laurie Burns Contributor Peter Laurie Burns Published by Oxford University Press, 1976; p. 22, 158n
Chinese Secret Societies in Malaya: A Survey of the Triad Society from 1800 to 1900 By Leon Comber Published for the Association for Asian Studies by J.J. Augustin, 1959; pp. 125, 309
The Official Catalogue of the Exhibits Published by Mason, Firth of M'Cutcheon, general printers, 1880; pp. xiii, 166, 167
Official record By Melbourne internat. exhib Published by, 1882; pp. xxiv, 500

External links
Hong Leong Bank At Foo Tye Sin Mansion
Hong Leong Bank At Foo Tye Sin Mansion

History of Penang
People of British Penang
People from Penang
Malaysian people of Hakka descent
People from Yongding District, Longyan
Year of birth missing
Year of death missing